Reading is the process of taking in the sense or meaning of letters, symbols, etc., especially by sight or touch.

For educators and researchers, reading is a multifaceted process involving such areas as word recognition, orthography (spelling), alphabetics, phonics, phonemic awareness, vocabulary, comprehension, fluency, and motivation.

Other types of reading and writing, such as pictograms (e.g., a hazard symbol and an emoji), are not based on speech-based writing systems. The common link is the interpretation of symbols to extract the meaning from the visual notations or tactile signals (as in the case of braille).

Overview

Reading is typically an individual activity, done silently, although on occasion a person reads out loud for other listeners; or reads aloud for one's own use, for better comprehension. Before the reintroduction of separated text (spaces between words) in the late Middle Ages, the ability to read silently was considered rather remarkable.

Major predictors of an individual's ability to read both alphabetic and non-alphabetic scripts are oral language skills, phonological awareness, rapid automatized naming and verbal IQ.

As a leisure activity, children and adults read because it is pleasant and interesting.  In the US, about half of all adults read one or more books for pleasure each year.  About 5% read more than 50 books per year.  Americans read more if they: have more education, read fluently and easily, are female, live in cities, and have higher socioeconomic status.  Children become better readers when they know more about the world in general, and when they perceive reading as fun rather than another chore to be performed.

Reading vs. literacy
Reading is an essential part of literacy, yet from a historical perspective literacy is about having the ability to both read and write.

And, since the 1990s some organizations have defined literacy in a wide variety of ways that may go beyond the traditional ability to read and write. The following are some examples:
 "the ability to read and write ... in all media (print or electronic), including digital literacy"
 "the ability to ... understand ... using printed and written materials associated with varying contexts"
 "the ability to read, write, speak and listen"
 "having the skills to be able to read, write and speak to understand and create meaning"
 "the ability to ... communicate using visual, audible, and digital materials"
 "the ability to use printed and written information to function in society, to achieve one's goals, and to develop one's knowledge and potential". It includes three types of adult literacy: prose (e.g., a newspaper article), documents (e.g., a bus schedule), and quantitative literacy (e.g., using arithmetic operations a in product advertisement).

In the academic field, some view literacy in a more philosophical manner and propose the concept of "multiliteracies". For example, they say, "this huge shift from traditional print-based literacy to 21st century multiliteracies reflects the impact of communication technologies and multimedia on the evolving nature of texts, as well as the skills and dispositions associated with the consumption, production, evaluation, and distribution of those texts (Borsheim, Meritt, & Reed, 2008, p. 87)". According to cognitive neuroscientist Mark Seidenberg these "multiple literacies" have allowed educators to change the topic from reading and writing to "Literacy". He goes on to say that some educators, when faced with criticisms of how reading is taught, "didn't alter their practices, they changed the subject".

Also, some organizations might include numeracy skills and technology skills separately but alongside of literacy skills.

In addition, since the 1940s the term literacy is often used to mean having knowledge or skill in a particular field (e.g., computer literacy, ecological literacy, health literacy, media literacy, quantitative literacy (numeracy) and visual literacy).

Writing systems

In order to understand a text, it is usually necessary to understand the spoken language associated with that text. In this way, writing systems are distinguished from many other symbolic communication systems. Once established, writing systems on the whole change more slowly than their spoken counterparts, and often preserve features and expressions which are no longer current in the spoken language. The great benefit of writing systems is their ability to maintain a persistent record of information expressed in a language, which can be retrieved independently of the initial act of formulation.

Cognitive benefits

Reading for pleasure has been linked to increased cognitive progress in vocabulary and mathematics during adolescence.
 Sustained high volume lifetime reading has been associated with high levels of academic attainment.

Research suggests that reading can improve stress management, memory, focus, writing skills, and imagination.

The cognitive benefits of reading continue into mid-life and the senior years.

Research suggests that reading books and writing are among the brain-stimulating activities that can slow down cognitive decline in seniors.

State of reading achievement

Reading has been the subject of considerable research and reporting for decades. Many organizations measure and report on reading achievement for children and adults (e.g., NAEP, PIRLS, PISA PIAAC, and EQAO).

Researchers have concluded that 95% of students can be taught to read by the end of first grade, yet in many countries 20% or more do not meet that expectation.

According to the 2019 Nation's Report card, 34% of grade four students in the United States failed to perform at or above the Basic reading level. There was a significant difference by race and ethnicity (e.g., black students at 52% and white students at 23%). After the impact of the covid-19 pandemic the average basic reading score dropped by 3% in 2022. See more about the breakdown by ethnicity in 2019 and 2022 here.

Globally, the covid-19 epidemic created a substantial overall learning deficit in reading abilities and other academic areas. It arose early in the pandemic and persists over time, and is particularly large among children from low socio-economic backgrounds.

In Canada, the provinces of Ontario and Nova Scotia, respectively, reported that 26% and 30% of grade three students did not meet the provincial reading standards in 2019. In Ontario, 53% of Grade 3 students with special education needs (students who have an Individual Education Plan), were not meeting the provincial standard.

The Progress in International Reading Literacy Study (PIRLS) publishes reading achievement for fourth graders in 50 countries. The five countries with the highest overall reading average are the Russian Federation, Singapore, Hong Kong SAR, Ireland and Finland. Some others are: England 10th, United States 15th, Australia 21st, Canada 23rd, and New Zealand 33rd.

The Programme for International Student Assessment (PISA) measures 15-year-old school pupils scholastic performance on mathematics, science, and reading.

The reading levels of adults, ages 16–65, in 39 countries are reported by the Programme for the International Assessment of Adult Competencies (PIAAC). Between 2011 and 2018, PIAAC reports the percentage of adults reading at-or-below level one (the lowest of five levels). Some examples are Japan 4.9%, Finland 10.6%, Netherlands 11.7%, Australia 12.6%, Sweden 13.3%, Canada 16.4%, England (UK) 16.4%, and the United States 16.9%.

According to the World Bank, 53% of all children in low-and-middle-income countries suffer from 'learning poverty'. In 2019, using data from the UNESCO Institute for Statistics, they published a report entitled Ending Learning Poverty: What will it take?. Learning poverty is defined as being unable to read and understand a simple text by age 10.

Although they say that all foundational skills are important, include reading, numeracy, basic reasoning ability, socio-emotional skills, and others – they focus specifically on reading. Their reasoning is that reading proficiency is an easily understood metric of learning, reading is a student's gateway to learning in every other area, and reading proficiency can serve as a proxy for foundational learning in other subjects.

They suggest five pillars to reduce learning poverty: 1) learners are prepared and motivated to learn, 2) teachers at all levels are effective and valued, 3) classrooms are equipped for learning, 4) Schools are safe and inclusive spaces, and 5) education systems are well-managed.

Learning to read
Learning to read or reading skills acquisition is the acquisition and practice of the skills necessary to understand the meaning behind printed words. For a skilled reader, the act of reading feels simple, effortless, and automatic. However, the process of learning to read is complex and builds on cognitive, linguistic, and social skills developed from a very early age. As one of the four core language skills (listening, speaking, reading and writing), reading is vital to gaining a command of written language.

In the United States and elsewhere, it is widely believed that students who lack proficiency in reading by the end of grade three may face obstacles for the rest of their academic career. For example, it is estimated that they would not be able to read half of the material they will encounter in grade four.

In 2019, among American fourth-graders in public schools, only 58% of Asians, 45% of Caucasians, 23% of Hispanics, and 18% of blacks  performed at or above the proficient level of the Nation's Report Card. Also, in 2012, in the United Kingdom it has been reported that 15-year-old students are reading at the age of 12-year-old students.

As a result, many governments put practices in place to ensure that students are reading at grade level by the end of grade three. An example of this is the Third Grade Reading Guarantee created by the State of Ohio in 2017. This is a program to identify students from kindergarten through grade three that are behind in reading, and provide support to make sure they are on track for reading success by the end of grade three. This is also known as remedial education. Another example is the policy in England whereby any pupil who is struggling to decode words properly by year three must "urgently" receive help through a "rigorous and systematic phonics programme".

In 2016, out of 50 countries, the United States achieved the 15th highest score in grade-four reading ability. The ten countries with the highest overall reading average are the Russian Federation, Singapore, Hong Kong SAR, Ireland, Finland, Poland, Northern Ireland, Norway, Chinese Taipei and England (UK). Some others are: Australia (21st), Canada (23rd), New Zealand (33rd), France (34th), Saudi Arabia (44th), and South Africa (50th).

Spoken language: the foundation of reading
Spoken language is the foundation of learning to read (long before children see any letters) and children's knowledge of the phonological structure of language is a good predictor of early reading ability. Spoken language is dominant for most of childhood, however, reading ultimately catches up and surpasses speech.

By their first birthday most children have learned all the sounds in their spoken language. However, it takes longer for them to learn the phonological form of words and to begin developing a spoken vocabulary.

Children acquire a spoken language in a few years. Five-to-six-year-old English learners have vocabularies of 2,500 to 5,000 words, and add 5,000 words per year for the first several years of schooling. This rapid learning rate cannot be accounted for by the instruction they receive. Instead, children learn that the meaning of a new word can be inferred because it occurs in the same context as familiar words (e.g., lion is often seen with cowardly and king). As British linguist John Rupert Firth says, "You shall know a word by the company it keeps".

The environment in which children live may also impact their ability to acquire reading skills. Children who are regularly exposed to chronic environmental noise pollution, such as highway traffic noise, have been known to show decreased ability to discriminate between phonemes (oral language sounds) as well as lower reading scores on standardized tests.

Reading to children: necessary but not sufficient

Children learn to speak naturally – by listening to other people speak. However, reading is not a natural process, and many children need to learn to read through a process that involves "systematic guidance and feedback".

So, "reading to children is not the same as teaching children to read". Nonetheless, reading to children is important because it socializes them to the activity of reading; it engages them; it expands their knowledge of spoken language; and it enriches their linguistic ability by hearing new and novel words and grammatical structures.

However, there is some evidence that "shared reading" with children does help to improve reading if the children's attention is directed to the words on the page as they are being read to.

Stages to skilled reading

The path to skilled reading involves learning the alphabetic principle, phonemic awareness, phonics, fluency, vocabulary and comprehension.

British psychologist Uta Frith introduced a three stages model to acquire skilled reading. Stage one is the logographic or pictorial stage where students attempt to grasp words as objects, an artificial form of reading. Stage two is the phonological stage where students learn the relationship between the graphemes (letters) and the phonemes (sounds). Stage three is the orthographic stage where students read familiar words more quickly than unfamiliar words, and word length gradually ceases to play a role.

Optimum age to learn to read
There is some debate as to the optimum age to teach children to read.

The Common Core State Standards Initiative (CCSS) in the United States has standards for foundational reading skills in kindergarten and grade one that include instruction in print concepts, phonological awareness, phonics, word recognition and fluency. However, some critics of CCSS say that "To achieve reading standards usually calls for long hours of drill and worksheets – and reduces other vital areas of learning such as math, science, social studies, art, music and creative play".

The PISA 2007 OECD data from 54 countries demonstrates "no association between school entry age ... and reading achievement at age 15". Also, a German study of 50 kindergartens compared children who, at age 5, had spent a year either "academically focused", or "play-arts focused" and found that in time the two groups became inseparable in reading skill. The authors conclude that the effects of early reading are like "watering a garden before a rainstorm; the earlier watering is rendered undetectable by the rainstorm, the watering wastes precious water, and the watering detracts the gardener from other important preparatory groundwork".

Some scholars favor a developmentally appropriate practice (DPA) in which formal instruction on reading begins when children are about six or seven years old. And to support that theory some point out that children in Finland start school at age seven (Finland ranked 5th in the 2016 PIRLS international grade four reading achievement.) In a discussion on academic kindergartens, professor of child development David Elkind has argued that, since "there is no solid research demonstrating that early academic training is superior to (or worse than) the more traditional, hands-on model of early education", educators should defer to developmental approaches that provide young children with ample time and opportunity to explore the natural world on their own terms. Elkind emphasized the principle that "early education must start with the child, not with the subject matter to be taught". In response, Grover J. Whitehurst, Director, Brown Center on Education Policy, (part of Brookings Institution) said David Elkind is relying too much on philosophies of education rather than science and research. He continues to say education practices are "doomed to cycles of fad and fancy" until they become more based on evidence-based practice.

On the subject of Finland's academic results, as some researchers point out, prior to starting school Finnish children must participate in one year of compulsory free pre-primary education and most are reading before they start school. And, with respect to developmentally appropriate practice (DPA), in 2019 the National Association for the Education of Young Children, Washington, D.C., released a draft position paper on DPA saying "The notion that young children are not ready for academic subject matter is a misunderstanding of developmentally appropriate practice; particularly in grades 1 through 3, almost all subject matter can be taught in ways that are meaningful and engaging for each child". And, researchers at The Institutes for the Achievement of Human Potential say it is a myth that early readers are bored or become trouble makers in school.

Other researchers and educators favor limited amounts of literacy instruction at the age of four and five, in addition to non-academic, intellectually stimulating activities.

Reviews of the academic literature by the Education Endowment Foundation in the UK have found that starting literacy teaching in preschool has "been consistently found to have a positive effect on early learning outcomes" and that "beginning early years education at a younger age appears to have a high positive impact on learning outcomes". This supports current standard practice in the UK which includes developing children's phonemic awareness in preschool and teaching reading from age four.

A study in Chicago reports that an early education program for children from low-income families is estimated to generate $4 to $11 of economic benefits over a child's lifetime for every dollar spent initially on the program, according to a cost-benefit analysis funded by the National Institutes of Health. The program is staffed by certified teachers and offers "instruction in reading and math, small group activities and educational field trips for children ages 3 through 9".

There does not appear to be any definitive research about the "magic window" to begin reading instruction. However, there is also no definitive research to suggest that starting early causes any harm. Researcher Timothy Shanahan, suggests, "Start teaching reading from the time you have kids available to teach, and pay attention to how they respond to this instruction – both in terms of how well they are learning what you are teaching, and how happy and invested they seem to be. If you haven't started yet, don't feel guilty, just get going".

Reading instruction by grade level
Some education researchers suggest the teaching of the various reading components by specific grade levels. The following is one example from Carol Tolman, Ed.D. and Louisa Moats, Ed.D. that corresponds in many respects with the United States Common Core State Standards Initiative:

Reading development
According to some researchers, learners (children and adults) progress through several stages while first learning to read in English, and then refining their reading skills. One of the recognized experts in this area is Harvard professor Jeanne Sternlicht Chall. In 1983 she published a book entitled Stages of Reading Development that proposed six stages.

Subsequently, in 2008 Maryanne Wolf, UCLA Graduate School of Education and Information Studies, published a book entitled Proust and the Squid in which she describes her view of the following five stages of reading development. It is normal that children will move through these stages at different rates; however, typical ages for children in the United States are shown below.

Emerging pre-reader: 6 months to 6 years old

The emerging pre-reader stage, also known as reading readiness, usually lasts for the first five years of a child's life. Children typically speak their first few words before their first birthday. Educators and parents help learners to develop their skills in listening, speaking, reading and writing.

Reading to children helps them to develop their vocabulary, a love of reading, and phonemic awareness, i.e. the ability to hear and manipulate the individual sounds (phonemes) of oral language. Children will often "read" stories they have memorized. However, in the late 1990s United States' researchers found that the traditional way of reading to children made little difference in their later ability to read because children spend relatively little time actually looking at the text. Yet, in a shared reading program with four-year-old children, teachers found that directing children's attention to the letters and words (e.g. verbally or pointing to the words) made a significant difference in early reading, spelling and comprehension.

Novice reader: 6 to 7 years old
Novice readers continue to develop their phonemic awareness, and come to realise that the letters (graphemes) connect to the sounds (phonemes) of the language; known as decoding, phonics, and the alphabetic principle. They may also memorize the most common letter patterns and some of the high-frequency words that do not necessarily follow basic phonological rules (e.g. have and who). However, it is a mistake to assume a reader understands the meaning of a text merely because they can decode it. Vocabulary and oral language comprehension are also important parts of text comprehension as described in the Simple view of reading, Scarborough's reading rope, and The active view of reading model. Reading and speech are codependent: reading promotes vocabulary development and a richer vocabulary facilitates skilled reading.

Decoding reader: 7 to 9 years old
The transition from the novice reader stage to the decoding stage is marked by a reduction of painful pronunciations and in its place the sounds of a smoother, more confident reader. In this phase the reader adds at least 3,000 words to what they can decode. For example, in the English language, readers now learn the variations of the vowel-based rimes (e.g. sat, mat, cat) and vowel pairs (also digraph) (e.g. rain, play, boat)

As readers move forward, they learn the make up of morphemes (i.e. stems, roots, prefixes and suffixes). They learn the common morphemes such as "s" and "ed" and see them as "sight chunks". "The faster a child can see that beheaded is be + head + ed", the faster they will become a more fluent reader.

In the beginning of this stage a child will often be devoting so much mental capacity to the process of decoding that they will have no understanding of the words being read. It is nevertheless an important stage, allowing the child to achieve their ultimate goal of becoming fluent and automatic.

It is in the decoding phase that the child will get to what the story is really about, and to learn to re-read a passage when necessary so as to truly understand it.

Fluent, comprehending reader: 9 to 15 years old
The goal of this stage is to "go below the surface of the text", and in the process the reader will build their knowledge of spelling substantially.

Teachers and parents may be tricked by fluent-sounding reading into thinking that a child understands everything that they are reading. As the content of what they are able to read becomes more demanding, good readers will develop knowledge of figurative language and irony which helps them to discover new meanings in the text.

Children improve their comprehension when they use a variety of tools such as connecting prior knowledge, predicting outcomes, drawing inferences, and monitoring gaps in their understanding. One of the most powerful moments is when fluent comprehending readers learn to enter into the lives of imagined heroes and heroines.

When teaching comprehension, the educational psychologist, G. Michael Pressley, says a strong case can be made for instruction in decoding, vocabulary, word knowledge, active comprehension strategies, and self-monitoring.

At the end of this stage, many processes are starting to become automatic, allowing the reader to focus on meaning. With the decoding process almost automatic by this point, the brain learns to integrate more metaphorical, inferential, analogical, background and experiential knowledge. This stage in learning to read will often last until early adulthood.

Expert reader: 16 years and older
At the expert stage it will usually only take a reader one-half second to read almost any word. The degree to which expert reading will change over the course of an adult's life depends on what they read and how much they read.

Science of reading

There is no single definition of the science of reading (SOR). Foundational skills such as phonics, decoding, and phonemic awareness are considered to be important parts of the science of reading, but they are not the only ingredients. SOR includes any research and evidence about how humans learn to read, and how reading should be taught. This includes areas such as oral reading fluency, vocabulary, morphology, reading comprehension, text, spelling and pronunciation, thinking strategies, oral language proficiency, working memory training, and written language performance (e.g., cohesion, sentence combining/reducing).

In addition, some educators feel that SOR should include digital literacy; background knowledge; content-rich instruction; infrastructural pillars (curriculum, reimagined teacher preparation, and leadership); adaptive teaching (recognizing the student's individual, culture and linguistic strengths); bi-literacy development; equity, social justice and supporting underserved populations (e.g., students from low-income backgrounds).

Some researchers suggest there is a need for more studies on the relationship between theory and practice. They say "we know more about the science of reading than about the science of teaching based on the science of reading", and "there are many layers between basic science findings and teacher implementation that must be traversed".

In cognitive science there is likely no area that has been more successful than the study of reading. Yet, in many countries reading levels are considered low. In the United States, the 2019 Nation's Report Card reported that 34% of grade-four public school students performed at or above the NAEP proficient level (solid academic performance) and 65% performed at or above the basic level (partial mastery of the proficient level skills). As reported in the PIRLS study, the United States ranked 15th out of 50 countries, for reading comprehension levels of fourth-graders. In addition, according to the 2011–2018 PIAAC study, out of 39 countries the United States ranked 19th for literacy levels of adults 16 to 65; and 16.9% of adults in the United States read at or below level one (out of five levels).

Many researchers are concerned that low reading levels are due to the manner in which reading is taught. They point to three areas: a) contemporary reading science has had very little impact on educational practice mainly because of a "two-cultures problem separating science and education", b) current teaching practices rest on outdated assumptions that make learning to read harder than it needs to be, and c) connecting evidence-based practice to educational practice would be beneficial but is extremely difficult to achieve because many teachers are not properly trained in the science of reading.

Simple view of reading

The simple view of reading is a scientific theory about reading comprehension. According to the theory, in order to comprehend what they are reading students need both decoding skills and oral language (listening) comprehension ability. Neither is enough on their own. In other words, they need the ability to recognize and process (e.g., sound out) the text, and the ability to understand the language in which the text is written (i.e., vocabulary, grammar and background knowledge). Students are not reading if they can decode words but do not understand their meaning. Similarly, students are not reading if they cannot decode words that they would ordinarily recognize and understand if they heard them spoken out loud.

It is expressed in this equation:
Decoding × Oral Language Comprehension = Reading Comprehension.

As shown in the graphic, the Simple View of Reading proposes four broad categories of developing readers: typical readers; poor readers (general reading disability); dyslexics; and hyperlexics.

Scarborough's reading rope
Hollis Scarborough, the creator of the Reading Rope and senior scientist at Haskins Laboratories, is a leading researcher of early language development and its connection to later literacy.

Scarborough published the Reading Rope infographic in 2001 using strands of rope to illustrate the many ingredients that are involved in becoming a skilled reader. The upper strands represent language-comprehension and reinforce one another. The lower strands represent word-recognition and work together as the reader becomes accurate, fluent, and automatic through practice. The upper and lower strands all weave together to produce a skilled reader.

More recent research by Laurie E. Cutting and Hollis S. Scarborough has highlighted the importance of executive function processes (e.g. working memory, planning, organization, self-monitoring, and similar abilities) to reading comprehension.  Easy texts do not require much executive functions, however more difficult text require more "focus on the ideas". Reading comprehension strategies, such as summarizing, may help.

The active view of reading model

The active view of reading (AVR) model (May 7, 2021), offers an alternative to the Simple view of reading (SVR), and a proposed update to Scarborough's reading rope (SRR). It reflects key insights from scientific research on reading that is not captured in the SVR and SRR. Although the AVR model has not been tested as a whole in research, "each element within the model has been tested in instructional research demonstrating positive, causal influences on reading comprehension".

The model lists contributors to reading (and potential causes of reading difficulty) – within, across, and beyond word recognition and language comprehension; including the elements of self-regulation. This feature of the model reflects the research documenting that not all profiles of reading difficulty are explained by low word recognition and/or low language comprehension. A second feature of the model is that it shows how word recognition and language comprehension overlap, and identifies processes that "bridge" these constructs.

The following chart shows the ingredients in the authors' infographic. In addition, the authors point out that reading is also impacted by text, task and sociocultural context.

How the brain reads
Several researchers and neuroscientists have attempted to explain how the brain reads. They have written articles and books, and created websites and YouTube videos to help the average consumer.

Neuroscientist Stanislas Dehaene says that a few simple truths should be accepted by all, namely: a) all children have similar brains, are well tuned to systematic grapheme-phoneme correspondences, "and have everything to gain from phonics – the only method that will give them the freedom to read any text", b) classroom size is largely irrelevant if the proper teaching methods are used, c) it is essential to have standardized screening tests for dyslexia, followed by appropriate specialized training, and d) while decoding is essential, vocabulary enrichment is equally important.

A study conducted at the Medical University of South Carolina (MUSC) in 2022 indicates that "greater left-brain asymmetry can predict both better and average performance on a foundational level of reading ability, depending on whether analysis is conducted over the whole brain or in specific regions". There have been correlations between specific brain regions in the left hemisphere of the cerebral cortex during different reading activities.

Although it is not included in most meta-analytical studies, the sensorimotor cortex of the brain is the most active region of the brain during reading. This is often disregarded because it is associated solely with movement; however, a 2014 fMRI study involving adults and children participants, where bodily movement was restricted, demonstrated strong evidence revealing that this region may be correlated with automatic word processing and decoding. The results of this study found this portion of the brain to be highly active in persons who were learning/struggling to read (children, those diagnosed with dyslexia, and those new to the English language) and less active in fluent adult readers.

The occipital and parietal lobes, or more specifically fusiform gyrus, include the brain's visual word form area (VWFA). The VWFA is believed to be responsible for the brain's ability to read visually. This area of the brain tends to be activated when words are presented orthographically, as found in a study in 2002 where participants were presented with word and non-word stimuli. During presentation of word stimuli, this portion of the brain was extremely active; however, during presentation of stimuli that did not involve graphemes the brain was less active. Participants with dyslexia remained outliers, with this area of the brain being consistently under active in both scenarios.

The two major regions of the brain associated with phonological skills are the temporal-parietal region and the Perisylvian Region. In an fMRI study conducted in 2001, participants were presented with written words, verbal frequency words, and verbal pseudo-words. The dorsal (upper) portion of the temporal-parietal region was the most active during the pseudo-words and the ventral (lower) portion was more active during frequency words, with the exception of subjects diagnosed with dyslexia, who showed no impairment to their ventral region but under-activation in the dorsal portion.

The Perisylvian Region, which is the portion of the brain believed to connect Broca's and Wernicke's area, is another region that is highly active during phonological activities where participants are asked to verbalize known and unknown words. Damage to this portion of this brain directly affects a person's ability to speak cohesively and with sense; furthermore, this portion of the brain activity remains consistent for both dyslexic and non-dyslexic readers.

The inferior frontal region is a much more complex region of the brain, and its association with reading is not necessarily linear, for it is active in several reading related activities. Several studies have recorded it's activity in association with comprehension and processing skills, as well as spelling and working memory  Although the exact role of this portion of the brain is still debatable, several studies indicate that this area of the brain tends to be more active in readers who have been diagnosed with dyslexia and less active when treatment is successfully undergone.

In addition to regions on the cortex, which is considered gray matter on fMRI's, there are several white matter fasciculus that are also active during different reading activities. These three regions are what connects the three respected cortex regions as the brain reads, thus it is responsible for the brains cross-model integration involved in reading. Three connective fasciculus that are prominently active during reading are the following: the left arcuate faciculus, the left inferior longitudinal faciculus, and the superior longitudinal fasciculus. All three areas are found to be weaker in readers diagnosed with dyslexia.

The cerebellum, which is not a part of the cerebral cortex, is also believed to play an important role in reading. When the cerebellum is impaired, victims struggle with many executive functioning and organizational skills both inside and outside of their reading ability. In a synthetic fMRI study, specific activities that displayed significant cerebellum involvement included automatization, word accuracy, and reading speed.

Eye movement and silent reading rate

Reading is an intensive process in which the eye quickly moves to assimilate the text – seeing just accurately enough to interpret groups of symbols. It is necessary to understand visual perception and eye movement in reading to understand the reading process.

When reading, the eye moves continuously along a line of text, but makes short rapid movements (saccades) intermingled with short stops (fixations). There is considerable variability in fixations (the point at which a saccade jumps to) and saccades between readers, and even for the same person reading a single passage of text. When reading, the eye has a perceptual span of about 20 slots. In the best-case scenario and reading English, when the eye is fixated on a letter, four to five letters to the right and three to four letters to the left can be clearly identified. Beyond that, only the general shape of some letters can be identified.

The eye movements of deaf readers differ from that of readers that can hear, and skilled deaf readers have shown to have shorter fixations and fewer refixations when reading.

Research published in 2019 concluded that the silent reading rate of adults in English for non-fiction is in the range of 175 to 300 words per minute (wpm); and for fiction the range is 200 to 320 words per minute.

Dual-route hypothesis to reading aloud

In the early 1970s the dual-route hypothesis to reading aloud was proposed, according to which there are two separate mental mechanisms involved in reading aloud, with output from both contributing to the pronunciation of written words. One mechanism is the lexical route whereby skilled readers can recognize a word as part of their sight vocabulary. The other is the nonlexical or sublexical route, in which the reader "sounds out" (decodes) written words.

The production effect

There is robust evidence that saying a word out loud makes it more memorable than simply reading it silently or hearing someone else say it. This memory benefit of "hearing oneself" is referred to as the production effect. The results of studies imply that oral production is beneficial because it entails two distinctive components: speaking (a motor act) and hearing oneself (the self-referential auditory input).

Evidence-based reading instruction

Evidence-based reading instruction refers to practices having research evidence showing their success in improving reading achievement. It is related to evidence-based education.

Several organizations report on research about reading instruction, for example:
 Best Evidence Encyclopedia (BEE) is a free website created by the Johns Hopkins University School of Education's Center for Data-Driven Reform in Education and is funded by the Institute of Education Sciences, U.S. Department of Education. In 2021, BEE released a review of research on 51 different programs for struggling readers in elementary schools. Many of the programs used phonics-based teaching and/or one or more other approaches. The conclusions of this report are shown at the section entitled Effectiveness of programs.
 Evidence for ESSA began in 2017 and is produced by the Center for Research and Reform in Education (CRRE) at Johns Hopkins University School of Education, Baltimore, MD. It offers free up-to-date information on current PK–12 programs in reading, math, social-emotional learning, and attendance that meet the standards of the Every Student Succeeds Act (ESSA) (the United States K–12 public education policy signed by President Obama in 2015).
 ProvenTutoring.org is a non-profit organization, a separate subsidiary of the non-profit Success for All. It is a resource for school systems and educators interested in research-proven tutoring programs. It lists programs that deliver tutoring programs that are proven effective in rigorous research as defined in the 2015 Every Student Succeeds Act. The Center for Research and Reform in Education at Johns Hopkins University provides the technical support to inform program selection.
 What Works Clearinghouse (WWC) of Washington, DC, was established in 2002 and evaluates numerous educational programs in twelve categories by the quality and quantity of the evidence and the effectiveness. It is operated by the federal National Center for Education Evaluation and Regional Assistance (NCEE), part of the Institute of Education Sciences (IES) Individual studies are available that have been reviewed by WWC and categorized according to the evidence tiers of the United States Every student succeeds act (ESSA).

Intervention reports are provided for programs according to twelve topics (e.g. literacy, mathematics, science, behavior, etc.).
 The British Educational Research Association (BERA) claims to be the home of educational research in the United Kingdom.
 Florida Center for Reading Research is a research center at Florida State University that explores all aspects of reading research. Its Resource Database allows you to search for information based on a variety of criteria.
 Institute of Education Sciences (IES), Washington, DC, is the statistics, research, and evaluation arm of the U.S. Department of Education. It funds independent education research, evaluation and statistics. It published a Synthesis of its Research on Early Intervention and Early Childhood Education in 2013. Its publications and products can be searched by author, subject, etc.
 National Foundation for Educational Research (NFER) is a non-profit research and development organization based in Berkshire, England. It produces independent research and reports about issues across the education system, such as Using Evidence in the Classroom: What Works and Why.
 Office for Standards in Education (Ofsted), in England, conducts research on schools, early education, social care, further education and skills.
 The Ministry of Education, Ontario, Canada offers a site entitled What Works? Research Into Practice. It is a collection of research summaries of promising teaching practice written by experts at Ontario universities.
 RAND Corporation, with offices throughout the world, funds research on early childhood, K–12, and higher education.
 ResearchED, a U.K. based non-profit since 2013 has organized education conferences around the world (e.g. Africa, Australia, Asia, Canada, the E.U., the Middle East, New Zealand, the U.K. and the U.S.) featuring researchers and educators in order to "promote collaboration between research-users and research-creators". It has been described as a "grass-roots teacher-led project that aims to make teachers research-literate and pseudo-science proof".

Reading from paper vs. screens
A systematic review and meta‐analysis was conducted on the advantages of reading from paper vs. screens. It found no difference in reading times, however, reading from paper has a small advantage in reading performance and metacognition. Other studies conclude that many children understand more from reading books vs. screens.

Apart from that, depending on the circumstances, some people prefer one medium over the other and each appears to have its own unique advantages.

Teacher training in science of reading
Some teachers, even after obtaining a master's degree in education, think they lack the necessary knowledge and skills to teach all students how to read. A 2019 survey of K-2 and special education teachers found that only 11 percent said they felt "completely prepared" to teach early reading after finishing their preservice programs. And, a 2021 study found that most U.S. states do not measure teachers' knowledge of the 'science of reading'. In addition, according to one study, as few as 2% of school districts use reading programs that follow the science of reading. Mark Seidenberg, a neuroscientist, states that, with few exceptions, teachers are not taught to teach reading and "don't know what they don't know".

A survey in the United States reported that 70% of teachers believe in a balanced literacy approach to teaching reading – however balanced literacy "is not systematic, explicit instruction". Teacher, researcher and author, Louisa Moats, in a video about teachers and science of reading, says that sometime, when teachers talk about their "philosophy" of teaching reading, she responds by saying, "But your 'philosophy' doesn't work". She says this is evidenced by the fact that so many children are struggling with reading. On another occasion, when asked what is the most frequent question teachers ask her, she replied, "over and over" they ask "why didn't anyone teach me this before?".
In an Education Week Research Center survey of more than 530 professors of reading instruction, only 22 percent said their philosophy of teaching early reading centered on explicit, systematic phonics with comprehension as a separate focus.

As of July 28, 2022, after Mississippi became the only state to improve reading results between 2017 and 2019, 30 U.S. states have since passed laws or implemented new policies related to evidence-based reading instruction. These requirements relate to six areas: teacher preparation; teacher certification or license renewal; professional development or coaching; assessment; material; and instruction or intervention. However, the adoption of these new requirements are by no means uniform. For example, only five states have requirements in all six areas, and three have requirements in only one area. Also, only fourteen states have requirements related to teacher certification or license renewal, whereas 25 have requirements for professional development or coaching. Furthermore, eight states do not allow or require 3rd-grade retention for students who are behind in reading. Experts say it is uncertain whether these new initiatives will lead to real improvements in children's reading results because old practices prove hard to shake.

Arkansas required every elementary and special education teacher to be proficient in the scientific research on reading by 2021; causing Amy Murdoch, an associate professor and the director of the reading science program at Mount St. Joseph University in Cincinnati to say "We still have a long way to go – but I do see some hope".

In 2021, the Department of Education and Early Childhood Development of New Brunswick appears to be the first in Canada to revise its K-2 reading curriculum based on "research-based instructional practice". For example, it replaced the various cueing systems with "mastery in the consolidated alphabetic to skilled reader phase". Although one document on the site, dated 1998, contains references to such practices as using "cueing systems" which is at odds with the department's current shift to using evidence-based practices. The Minister of Education in Ontario, Canada followed by stating plans to revise the elementary language curriculum and the Grade 9 English course with "scientific, evidence-based approaches that emphasize direct, explicit and systematic instruction and removing references to unscientific discovery and inquiry-based learning, including the three-cueing system, by 2023."

Some non-profit organizations, such as the Center for Development and Learning (Louisiana) and the Reading League (New York State), offer training programs for teachers to learn about the science of reading. ResearchED, a U.K. based non-profit since 2013 has organized education conferences around the world featuring researchers and educators in order to promote collaboration between research-users and research-creators.

Timothy Shanahan acknowledges that comprehensive research does not always exist for specific aspects of reading instruction. However, "the lack of evidence doesn't mean something doesn't work, only that we don't know". He suggests that teachers make use of the research that is available in such places as Journal of Educational Psychology, Reading Research Quarterly, Reading & Writing Quarterly, Review of Educational Research, and Scientific Studies of Reading. If a practice lacks supporting evidence, it can be used with the understanding that it is based upon a claim, not science.

Teaching reading

Alphabetic languages
Educators have debated for years about which method is best to teach reading for the English language. There are three main methods, phonics, whole language and balanced literacy. There are also a variety of other areas and practices such as phonemic awareness, fluency, reading comprehension, sight words and sight vocabulary, the three-cueing system (the searchlights model in England), guided reading, shared reading, and leveled reading. Each practice is employed in different manners depending on the country and the specific school division.

In 2001, some researchers reached two conclusions: 1) "mastering the alphabetic principle is essential" and 2) "instructional techniques (namely, phonics) that teach this principle directly are more effective than those that do not". However, while they make it clear they have some fundamental disagreements with some of the claims made by whole-language advocates, some principles of whole language have value such as the need to ensure that students are enthusiastic about books and eager to learn to read.

Phonics and related areas

Phonics emphasizes the alphabetic principle – the idea that letters (graphemes) represent the sounds of speech (phonemes). It is taught in a variety of ways; some are systematic and others are unsystematic. Unsystematic phonics teaches phonics on a "when needed" basis and in no particular sequence. Systematic phonics uses a planned, sequential introduction of a set of phonic elements along with explicit teaching and practice of those elements. The National Reading Panel (NRP) concluded that systematic phonics instruction is more effective than unsystematic phonics or non-phonics instruction.

Phonics approaches include analogy phonics, analytic phonics, embedded phonics with mini-lessons, phonics through spelling, and synthetic phonics.

According to a 2018 review of research related to English speaking poor readers, phonics training is effective for improving literacy-related skills, particularly the fluent reading of words and non-words, and the accurate reading of irregular words.

In addition, phonics produces higher achievement for all beginning readers, and the greatest improvement is experienced by students who are at risk of failing to learn to read. While some children are able to infer these rules on their own, some need explicit instruction on phonics rules. Some phonics instruction has marked benefits such as expansion of a student's vocabulary. Overall, children who are directly taught phonics are better at reading, spelling and comprehension.

A challenge in teaching phonics is that in some languages, such as English, complex letter-sound correspondences can cause confusion for beginning readers. For this reason, it is recommended that teachers of English-reading begin by introducing the "most frequent sounds" and the "common spellings", and save the less frequent sounds and complex spellings for later (e.g. the sounds /s/ and /t/ before /v/ and /w/; and the spellings cake before eight and cat before duck).

Phonics is gaining world-wide acceptance.

Combining phonics with other literacy instruction

Phonics is taught in many different ways and it is often taught together with some of the following: oral language skills, concepts about print, phonological awareness, phonemic awareness, phonology, oral reading fluency, vocabulary, syllables, reading comprehension, spelling, word study, cooperative learning, multisensory learning, and guided reading. And, phonics is often featured in discussions about science of reading, and evidence-based practices.

The National Reading Panel (U.S. 2000) is clear that "systematic phonics instruction should be integrated with other reading instruction to create a balanced reading program". It suggests that phonics be taught together with phonemic awareness, oral fluency, vocabulary and comprehension. Timothy Shanahan (educator), a member of that panel, recommends that primary students receive 60–90 minutes per day of explicit, systematic, literacy instruction time; and that it be divided equally between a) words and word parts (e.g. letters, sounds, decoding and phonemic awareness), b) oral reading fluency, c) reading comprehension, and d) writing. Furthermore, he states that "the phonemic awareness skills found to give the greatest reading advantage to kindergarten and first-grade children are segmenting and blending".

The Ontario Association of Deans of Education (Canada) published research Monograph # 37 entitled Supporting early language and literacy with suggestions for parents and teachers in helping children prior to grade one. It covers the areas of letter names and letter-sound correspondence (phonics), as well as conversation, play-based learning, print, phonological awareness, shared reading, and vocabulary.

Effectiveness of programs
Some researchers report that teaching reading without teaching phonics is harmful to large numbers of students; yet not all phonics teaching programs produce effective results. The reason is that the effectiveness of a program depends on using the right curriculum together with the appropriate approach to instruction techniques, classroom management, grouping, and other factors. Louisa Moats, a teacher, psychologist and researcher, has long advocated for reading instruction that is direct, explicit and systematic, covering phoneme awareness, decoding, comprehension, literature appreciation, and daily exposure to a variety of texts. She maintains that "reading failure can be prevented in all but a small percentage of children with serious learning disorders. It is possible to teach most students how to read if we start early and follow the significant body of research showing which practices are most effective".

Interest in evidence-based education appears to be growing. In 2021, Best evidence encyclopedia (BEE) released a review of research on 51 different programs for struggling readers in elementary schools. Many of the programs used phonics-based teaching and/or one or more of the following: cooperative learning, technology-supported adaptive instruction (see Educational technology), metacognitive skills, phonemic awareness, word reading, fluency, vocabulary, multisensory learning, spelling, guided reading, reading comprehension, word analysis, structured curriculum, and balanced literacy (non-phonetic approach).

The BEE review concludes that a) outcomes were positive for one-to-one tutoring, b) outcomes were positive, but not as large, for one-to-small group tutoring, c) there were no differences in outcomes between teachers and teaching assistants as tutors, d) technology-supported adaptive instruction did not have positive outcomes, e) whole-class approaches (mostly cooperative learning) and whole-school approaches incorporating tutoring obtained outcomes for struggling readers as large as those found for one- to-one tutoring, and benefitted many more students, and f) approaches mixing classroom and school improvements, with tutoring for the most at-risk students, have the greatest potential for the largest numbers of struggling readers.

Robert Slavin, of BEE, goes so far as to suggest that states should "hire thousands of tutors" to support students scoring far below grade level – particularly in elementary school reading. Research, he says, shows "only tutoring, both one-to-one and one-to-small group, in reading and mathematics, had an effect size larger than +0.10 ... averages are around +0.30", and "well-trained teaching assistants using structured tutoring materials or software can obtain outcomes as good as those obtained by certified teachers as tutors".

What works clearinghouse allows you to see the effectiveness of specific programs. For example, as of 2020 they have data on 231 literacy programs. If you filter them by grade 1 only, all class types, all school types, all delivery methods, all program types, and all outcomes you receive 22 programs. You can then view the program details and, if you wish, compare one with another.

Evidence for ESSA (Center for Research and Reform in Education) offers free up-to-date information on current PK–12 programs in reading, writing, math, science, and others that meet the standards of the Every Student Succeeds Act (U.S.).

ProvenTutoring.org a non-profit organization, is a resource for educators interested in research-proven tutoring programs. The programs it lists are proven effective in rigorous research as defined in the 2015 Every Student Succeeds Act. The Center for Research and Reform in Education at Johns Hopkins University provides the technical support to inform program selection.

Systematic phonics

Systematic phonics is not one specific method of teaching phonics; it is a term used to describe phonics approaches that are taught explicitly and in a structured, systematic manner. They are systematic because the letters and the sounds they relate to are taught in a specific sequence, as opposed to incidentally or on a "when needed" basis.

The National Reading Panel (NRP) concluded that systematic phonics instruction is more effective than unsystematic phonics or non-phonics instruction. The NRP also found that systematic phonics instruction is effective (with varying degrees) when delivered through one-to-one tutoring, small groups, and teaching classes of students; and is effective from kindergarten onward, the earlier the better. It helps significantly with word-reading skills and reading comprehension for kindergartners and 1st graders as well as for older struggling readers and reading disabled students. Benefits to spelling were positive for kindergartners and 1st graders but not for older students.

Systematic phonics is sometimes mischaracterized as "skill and drill" with little attention to meaning. However, researchers point out that this impression is false. Teachers can use engaging games or materials to teach letter-sound connections, and it can also be incorporated with the reading of meaningful text.

Phonics can be taught systematically in a variety of ways, such as: analogy phonics, analytic phonics, phonics through spelling, and synthetic phonics. However, their effectiveness vary considerably because the methods differ in such areas as the range of letter-sound coverage, the structure of the lesson plans, and the time devoted to specific instructions.

Systematic phonics has gained increased acceptance in different parts of the world since the completion of three major studies into teaching reading; one in the US in 2000, another in Australia in 2005, and the other in the UK in 2006.

In 2009, the UK Department of Education published a curriculum review that added support for systematic phonics. In fact, systematic phonics in the UK is known as Synthetic phonics.

Beginning as early as 2014, several states in the United States have changed their curriculum to include systematic phonics instruction in elementary school.

In 2018, the State Government of Victoria, Australia, published a website containing a comprehensive Literacy Teaching Toolkit including Effective Reading Instruction, Phonics, and Sample Phonics Lessons.

Analytic phonics and analogy phonics

Analytic phonics does not involve pronouncing individual sounds (phonemes) in isolation and blending the sounds, as is done in synthetic phonics. Rather, it is taught at the word level and students learn to analyze letter-sound relationships once the word is identified. Also, students might be asked to practice saying words with similar sounds such as ball, bat and bite. Furthermore, students are taught consonant blends (separate, adjacent consonants) as units, such as break or shrouds.

Analogy phonics is a particular type of analytic phonics in which the teacher has students analyze phonic elements according to the speech sounds (phonograms) in the word. For example, a type of phonogram (known in linguistics as a rime) is composed of the vowel and the consonant sounds that follow it (e.g. in the words cat, mat and sat, the rime is "at".) Teachers using the analogy method may have students memorize a bank of phonograms, such as -at or -am, or use word families (e.g. can, ran, man, or may, play, say).

There have been studies on the effectiveness of instruction using analytic phonics vs. synthetic phonics. Johnston et al. (2012) conducted experimental research studies that tested the effectiveness of phonics learning instruction among 10-year-old boys and girls.  They used  comparative data from the Clackmannanshire Report and chose 393 participants to compare synthetic phonics instruction and analytic phonics instruction.  The boys taught by the synthetic phonics method had better word reading than the girls in their classes, and their spelling and reading comprehension was as good. On the other hand, with analytic phonics teaching, although the boys performed as well as the girls in word reading, they had inferior spelling and reading comprehension. Overall, the group taught by synthetic phonics had better word reading, spelling, and reading comprehension. And, synthetic phonics did not lead to any impairment in the reading of irregular words.

Embedded phonics with mini-lessons
Embedded phonics, also known as incidental phonics, is the type of phonics instruction used in whole language programs. It is not systematic phonics. Although phonics skills are de-emphasised in whole language programs, some teachers include phonics "mini-lessons" when students struggle with words while reading from a book. Short lessons are included based on phonics elements the students are having trouble with, or on a new or difficult phonics pattern that appears in a class reading assignment. The focus on meaning is generally maintained, but the mini-lesson provides some time for focus on individual sounds and the letters that represent them. Embedded phonics is different from other methods because instruction is always in the context of literature rather than in separate lessons about distinct sounds and letters; and skills are taught when an opportunity arises, not systematically.

Phonics through spelling
For some teachers this is a method of teaching spelling by using the sounds (phonemes). However, it can also be a method of teaching reading by focusing on the sounds and their spelling (i.e. phonemes and syllables). It is taught systematically with guided lessons conducted in a direct and explicit manner including appropriate feedback. Sometimes mnemonic cards containing individual sounds are used to allow the student to practice saying the sounds that are related to a letter or letters (e.g. a, e, i, o, u). Accuracy comes first, followed by speed. The sounds may be grouped by categories such as vowels that sound short (e.g. c-a-t and s-i-t). When the student is comfortable recognizing and saying the sounds, the following steps might be followed: a) the tutor says a target word and the student repeats it out loud, b) the student writes down each individual sound (letter) until the word is completely spelled, saying each sound as it is written, and c) the student says the entire word out loud. An alternate method would be to have the student use mnemonic cards to sound-out (spell) the target word.

Typically, the instruction starts with sounds that have only one letter and simple CVC words such as sat and pin. Then it progresses to longer words, and sounds with more than one letter (e.g. hear and day), and perhaps even syllables (e.g. wa-ter). Sometimes the student practices by saying (or sounding-out) cards that contain entire words.

Synthetic phonics

Synthetic phonics, also known as blended phonics, is a systematic phonics method employed to teach students to read by sounding out the letters then blending the sounds to form the word. This method involves learning how letters or letter groups represent individual sounds, and that those sounds are blended to form a word. For example, shrouds would be read by pronouncing the sounds for each spelling, sh, r, ou, d, s (IPA ), then blending those sounds orally to produce a spoken word, sh – r – ou – d – s = shrouds (IPA ). The goal of a synthetic phonics instructional program is that students identify the sound-symbol correspondences and blend their phonemes automatically. Since 2005, synthetic phonics has become the accepted method of teaching reading (by phonics instruction) in England, Scotland and Australia.

The 2005 Rose Report from the UK concluded that systematic synthetic phonics was the most effective method for teaching reading. It also suggests the "best teaching" included a brisk pace, engaging children's interest with multi-sensory activities and stimulating resources, praise for effort and achievement; and above all, the full backing of the headteacher.

It also has considerable support in some States in the U.S. and some support from expert panels in Canada.

In the US, a pilot program using the Core Knowledge Early Literacy program that used this type of phonics approach showed significantly higher results in K–3 reading compared with comparison schools. In addition, several States such as California, Ohio, New York and Arkansas, are promoting the principles of synthetic phonics (see synthetic phonics in the United States).

Resources for teaching phonics are available here

Related areas

Phonemic awareness

Phonemic awareness is the process by which the phonemes (sounds of oral language) are heard, interpreted, understood and manipulated – unrelated to their grapheme (written language). It is a sub-set of Phonological awareness that includes the manipulation of rhymes, syllables, and onsets and rimes, and is most prevalent in alphabetic systems. The specific part of speech depends on the writing system employed. The National Reading Panel (NPR) concluded that phonemic awareness improves a learner's ability to learn to read. When teaching phonemic awareness, the NRP found that better results were obtained with focused and explicit instruction of one or two elements, over five or more hours, in small groups, and using the corresponding graphemes (letters). See also Speech perception. As mentioned earlier, some researchers feel that the most effective way of teaching phonemic awareness is through segmenting and blending, a key part of synthetic phonics.

Vocabulary
A critical aspect of reading comprehension is vocabulary development. When a reader encounters an unfamiliar word in print and decodes it to derive its spoken pronunciation, the reader understands the word if it is in the reader's spoken vocabulary. Otherwise, the reader must derive the meaning of the word using another strategy, such as context. If the development of the child's vocabulary is impeded by things such as ear infections that inhibit the child from hearing new words consistently then the development of reading will also be impaired.

Sight vocabulary vs. sight words
Sight words (i.e. high-frequency or common words), sometimes called the "look-say" method or whole-word method, are not a part of the phonics method. They are usually associated with whole language and balanced literacy where students are expected to memorize common words such as those on the Dolch word list and the Fry word list (e.g. a, be, call, do, eat, fall, gave, etc.). The supposition (in whole language and balanced literacy) is that students will learn to read more easily if they memorize the most common words they will encounter, especially words that are not easily decoded (i.e. exceptions).

On the other hand, using sight words as a method of teaching reading in English is seen as being at odds with the alphabetic principle and treating English as though it was a logographic language (e.g. Chinese or Japanese).

In addition, according to research, whole-word memorisation is "labor-intensive", requiring on average about 35 trials per word. Also, phonics advocates say that most words are decodable, so comparatively few words have to be memorized. And because a child will over time encounter many low-frequency words, "the phonological recoding mechanism is a very powerful, indeed essential, mechanism throughout reading development". Furthermore, researchers suggest that teachers who withhold phonics instruction to make it easier on children "are having the opposite effect" by making it harder for children to gain basic word-recognition skills. They suggest that learners should focus on understanding the principles of phonics so they can recognize the phonemic overlaps among words (e.g. have, had, has, having, haven't, etc.), making it easier to decode them all.

Sight vocabulary is a part of the phonics method. It describes words that are stored in long-term memory and read automatically. Skilled fully-alphabetic readers learn to store words in long-term memory without memorization (i.e. a mental dictionary), making reading and comprehension easier. "Once you know the sound-based way to decode, your mind learns what words look like, even if you're not especially trying to do so". The process, called orthographic mapping, involves decoding, crosschecking, mental marking and rereading. It takes significantly less time than memorization. This process works for fully-alphabetic readers when reading simple decodable words from left to right through the word. Irregular words pose more of a challenge, yet research in 2018 concluded that "fully-alphabetic students" learn irregular words more easily when they use a process called hierarchical decoding. In this process, students, rather than decode from left to right, are taught to focus attention on the irregular elements such as a vowel-digraph and a silent-e; for example, break (b – r – ea – k), height (h – eigh – t), touch (t – ou – ch), and make (m – a – ke). Consequentially, they suggest that teachers and tutors should focus on "teaching decoding with more advanced vowel patterns before expecting young readers to tackle irregular words".

Fluency

Fluency is ability to read orally with speed, accuracy, and vocal expression. The ability to read fluently is one of several critical factors necessary for reading comprehension. If a reader is not fluent, it may be difficult to remember what has been read and to relate the ideas expressed in the text to their background knowledge. This accuracy and automaticity of reading serves as a bridge between decoding and comprehension.

Reading comprehension
The NRP describes reading comprehension as a complex cognitive process in which a reader intentionally and interactively engages with the text. The science of reading says that reading comprehension is heavily dependent on word recognition (i.e., phonological awareness, decoding, etc.) and oral language comprehension (i.e., background knowledge, vocabulary, etc.). Phonological awareness and rapid naming predict reading comprehension in second grade but oral language skills account for an additional 13.8% of the variance. It has also been found that sustained content literacy intervention instruction that gradually build thematic connections may help young children transfer their knowledge to related topics, leading to improved comprehension.

Reading and spelling
Evidence supports the strong synergy between reading (decoding) and spelling (encoding), especially for children in kindergarten or grade one and elementary school students at risk for literacy difficulties.

Using embedded picture, mnemonic alphabet cards when teaching phonics
Research supports the use of embedded, picture mnemonic (memory support) alphabet cards when teaching letters and sounds, but not words.

Whole language

Whole language has the reputation of being a meaning-based method of teaching reading that emphasizes literature and text comprehension. It discourages any significant use of phonics, if at all. Instead, it trains students to focus on words, sentences and paragraphs as a whole rather than letters and sounds. Students are taught to use context and pictures to "guess" words they do not recognize, or even just skip them and read on. It aims to make reading fun, yet many students struggle to figure out the specific rules of the language on their own, which causes the student's decoding and spelling to suffer.

The following are some features of the whole language philosophy:
 Children are expected to learn to read and write as they learned to talk, that is gradually, without a great deal of direct instruction. (However, researchers and neuroscientists say that learning to read, unlike learning to talk, is not a natural process and many learners require explicit instruction. They point out that millions of adults can speak their language just fine, yet they cannot read their language.)
 Learning is emphasized more than teaching. It is assumed that the students will learn to read and write, and the teacher facilitates that growth.
 Students read and write every day in a variety of situations.
 Reading, writing, and spoken language are not considered separate components of the curriculum or merely ends in themselves; rather they permeate everything the students are doing.
 There is no division between first learning to read and later reading to learn.

As of 2020, whole language is widely used in the US and Canada (often as balanced literacy), however, in some US States and many other countries, such as Australia and the United Kingdom, it has lost favor or been abandoned because it is not supported by evidence. Some notable researchers have clearly stated their disapproval of whole language and whole-word teaching. In his 2009 book, Reading in the brain, cognitive neuroscientist, Stanislas Dehaene, said "cognitive psychology directly refutes any notion of teaching via a 'global' or 'whole language' method". He goes on to talk about "the myth of whole-word reading", saying it has been refuted by recent experiments. "We do not recognize a printed word through a holistic grasping of its contours, because our brain breaks it down into letters and graphemes". In addition, cognitive neuroscientist Mark Seidenberg, in his 2017 book Language at the speed of light, refers to whole language as a "theoretical zombie" because it persists in spite of a lack of supporting evidence.

Balanced literacy

Balanced literacy is not well defined, however it is intended as a method that combines elements of both phonics and whole language. According to a survey in 2010, 68% of elementary school teachers in the United States profess to use balanced literacy. However, only 52% of teachers in the United States include phonics in their definition of balanced literacy.

The National Reading Panel concluded that phonics must be integrated with instruction in phonemic awareness, vocabulary, fluency, and comprehension. And, some studies indicate that "the addition of language activities and tutoring to phonics produced larger effects than any of these components in isolation". They suggest that this may be a constructive way to view balanced reading instruction.

However, balanced literacy has received criticism from researchers and others suggesting that, in many instances, it is merely whole language by another name.

According to phonics advocate and cognitive neuroscientist Mark Seidenberg, balanced literacy allows educators to diffuse the reading wars while not making specific recommendations for change. He goes on to say that, in his opinion, the high number of struggling readers in the United States is the result of the manner in which teachers are taught to teach reading. He also says that struggling readers should not be encouraged to skip a challenging word, nor rely on pictures or semantic and syntactic cues to "guess at" a challenging word. Instead, they should use evidence-based decoding methods such as systematic phonics.

Structured Literacy

Structured literacy has many of the elements of systematic phonics and few of the elements of balanced literacy. It is defined as explicit, systematic teaching that focuses on phonological awareness, word recognition, phonics and decoding, spelling, and syntax at the sentence and paragraph levels. It is considered to be beneficial for all early literacy learners, especially those with dyslexia.

According to the International Dyslexia Association, structured literacy contains the elements of phonology and phonemic awareness, sound-symbol association (the alphabetic principle and phonics), syllables, morphology, syntax, and semantics. The elements are taught using methods that are systematic, cumulative, explicit, multisensory, and use diagnostic assessment.

Three cueing system (Searchlights model)
The three-cueing system (the searchlights model in England) is a theory that has been circulating since the 1980s. Its roots are in the theories proposed in 1960s by Ken Goodman and Marie Clay that eventually became whole language, reading recovery and guided reading (e.g., Fountas and Pinnell early reading programs). As of 2010, 75% of teachers in the United States teach the three-cueing system. It proposes that children who are stuck on a word should use various "cues" to figure it out and determine (guess) its meaning. The "meaning cues" are semantic ("does it make sense in the context?"), syntactic (is it a noun, verb, etc.?) and graphophonic (what are the letter-sound relationships?). It is also known as MSV (Meaning, Sentence structure/syntax and Visual information such as the letters in the words).

According to some, three-cueing is not the most effective way for beginning readers to learn how to decode printed text. While a cueing system does help students to "make better guesses", it does not help when the words become more sophisticated; and it reduces the amount of practice time available to learn essential decoding skills. They also say that students should first decode the word, "then they can use context to figure out the meaning of any word they don't understand".

Consequently, researchers such as cognitive neuroscientists Mark Seidenberg and professor Timothy Shanahan do not support the theory. They say the three-cueing system's value in reading instruction "is a magnificent work of the imagination", and it developed not because teachers lack integrity, commitment, motivation, sincerity, or intelligence, but because they "were poorly trained and advised" about the science of reading. In England, the simple view of reading and synthetic phonics are intended to replace "the searchlights multi-cueing model". On the other hand, some researchers suggest that "context" can be useful, not to guess a word, but to confirm a word after it has been phonetically decoded.

Three Ps (3Ps) – Pause Prompt Praise
The three Ps approach is used by teachers, tutors and parents to guide oral reading practice with a struggling reader. For some, it is merely a variation of the above-mentioned three-cueing system.

However, for others it is very different. For example: when a student encounters a word they do not know or get it wrong, the three steps are: 1) pause to see if they can fix it themselves, even letting them read on a little, 2) prompt them with strategies to find the correct pronunciation, and 3) praise them directly and genuinely. In the prompt step, the tutor does not suggest the student skip the word or guess the word based on the pictures or the first sound. Instead, they encourage student to use their decoding training to sound out the word, and use the context (meaning) to confirm they have found the correct word.

Guided reading, reading workshop, shared reading, leveled reading, silent reading (and self-teaching)
Guided reading is small group reading instruction that is intended to allow for the differences in students' reading abilities. While they are reading, students are encouraged to use strategies from the three-cueing system, the searchlights model, or MSV.

It is no longer supported by the Primary National Strategy in England as Synthetic phonics is the officially recognized method for teaching reading.

In the United States, Guided Reading is part of the Reading Workshop model of reading instruction.

The reading workshop model provides students with a collection of books, allows them the choice of what to read, limits students' reading to texts that can be easily read by them, provides teaching through mini-lessons, and monitors and supports reading comprehension development through one-on-one teacher-student conferences. Some reports state that it is 'unlikely to lead to literacy success' for all students, particularly those lacking foundational skills.

Shared (oral) reading is an activity whereby the teacher and students read from a shared text that is determined to be at the students' reading level.

Leveled reading involves students reading from "leveled books" at an appropriate reading level. A student that struggles with a word is encouraged to use a cueing system (e.g. three-cueing, searchlights model or MSV) to guess its meaning. There are many systems that purport to gauge the students' reading levels using scales incorporating numbers, letters, colors and lexile readability scores.

Silent reading (and self-teaching) is a common practice in elementary schools. A 2007 study in the United States found that, on average only 37% of class time was spent on active reading instruction or practice, and the most frequent activity was students reading silently. Based on the limited available studies on silent reading, the NRP concluded that independent silent reading did not prove an effective practice when used as the only type of reading instruction to develop fluency and other reading skills – particularly with students who have not yet developed critical alphabetic and word reading skills.

Other studies indicate that, unlike silent reading, "oral reading increases phonological effects".

According to some, the classroom method called DEAR (Drop everything and read) is not the best use of classroom time for students who are not yet fluent. However, according to the self-teaching hypothesis, when fluent readers practice decoding words while reading silently, they learn what whole words look like (spelling), leading to improved fluency and comprehension.

The suggestion is: "if some students are fluent readers, they could read silently while the teacher works with the struggling readers".

Logographic languages 

Languages such as Chinese and Japanese are normally written (fully or partly) in logograms (hanzi and kanji, respectively), which represent a whole word or morpheme with a single character. There are a large number of characters, and the sound that each makes must be learned directly or from other characters which contain "hints" in them. For example, in Japanese, the On-reading of the kanji 民 is min and the related kanji 眠 shares the same On-reading, min: the right-hand part shows the character's pronunciation. However this is not true for all characters. Kun readings, on the other hand, have to be learned and memorized as there is no way to tell from each character.

Ruby characters are used in textbooks to help children learn the sounds that each logogram makes. These are written in a smaller size, using an alphabetic or syllabic script. For example, hiragana is typically used in Japanese, and the pinyin romanization into Latin alphabet characters is used in Chinese.

The examples above each spell the word kanji, which is made up of two kanji characters: 漢 (kan, written in hiragana as かん), and 字 (ji, written in hiragana as じ).

Textbooks are sometimes edited as a cohesive set across grades so that children will not encounter characters they are not yet expected to have learned.

The Reading Wars: phonics vs. whole language

A debate has been going on for decades about the merits of phonics vs. whole language. It is sometimes referred to as the Reading Wars.

Phonics was a popular way to learn reading in the 19th century. William Holmes McGuffey (1800–1873), an American educator, author, and Presbyterian minister who had a lifelong interest in teaching children, compiled the first four of the McGuffey Readers in 1836.

Then, in 1841 Horace Mann, the Secretary of the Massachusetts Board of Education, advocated for a whole-word method of teaching reading to replace phonics. Others, such as Rudolf Flesch, advocated for a return to phonics in his book Why Johnny Can't Read (1955). The whole-word method received support from Kenneth J. Goodman who wrote an article in 1967 entitled Reading: A psycholinguistic guessing game. Although not supported by scientific studies, the theory became very influential as the whole language method. Since the 1970s some whole language supporters such as Frank Smith (psycholinguist), are unyielding in arguing that phonics should be taught little, if at all.

Yet, other researchers say instruction in phonics and phonemic awareness are "critically important" and "essential" to develop early reading skills. In 2000, the National Reading Panel (U.S.) identified five ingredients of effective reading instruction, of which phonics is one; the other four are phonemic awareness, fluency, vocabulary and comprehension. Reports from other countries, such as the Australian report on Teaching reading (2005) and the U.K. Independent review of the teaching of early reading (Rose Report 2006) have also supported the use of phonics.

Some notable researchers such as Stanislas Dehaene and Mark Seidenberg have clearly stated their disapproval of whole language.

Furthermore, a 2017 study in the UK that compared teaching with phonics vs. teaching whole written words concluded that phonics is more effective, saying "our findings suggest that interventions aiming to improve the accuracy of reading aloud and/or comprehension in the early stages of learning should focus on the systematicities present in print-to-sound relationships, rather than attempting to teach direct access to the meanings of whole written words".

More recently, some educators have advocated for the theory of balanced literacy purported to combine phonics and whole language yet not necessarily in a consistent or systematic manner. It may include elements such as word study and phonics mini-lessons, differentiated learning, cueing, leveled reading, shared reading, guided reading, independent reading and sight words. According to a survey in 2010, 68% of K–2 teachers in the United States practice balanced literacy; however, only 52% of teachers included phonics in their definition of balanced literacy. In addition, 75% of teachers teach the three-cueing system (i.e., meaning/structure/visual or semantic/syntactic/graphophonic) that has its roots in whole language.

In addition, some phonics supporters assert that balanced literacy is merely whole language by another name. And critics of whole language and sceptics of balanced literacy, such as neuroscientist Mark Seidenberg, state that struggling readers should not be encouraged to skip words they find puzzling or rely on semantic and syntactic cues to guess words.

Over time a growing number of countries and states have put greater emphasis on phonics and other evidence-based practices (see Phonics practices by country or region).

Requirements for proficient reading
According to the report by the US National Reading Panel (NRP) in 2000, the elements required for proficient reading of alphabetic languages are phonemic awareness, phonics, fluency, vocabulary, and text comprehension. In non-Latin languages, proficient reading does not necessarily require phonemic awareness, but rather an awareness of the individual parts of speech, which may also include the whole word (as in Chinese characters) or syllables (as in Japanese) as well as others depending on the writing system being employed.

The Rose Report, from the Department for Education in England makes it clear that, in their view, systematic phonics, specifically synthetic phonics, is the best way to ensure that children learn to read; such that it is now the law. In 2005 the government of Australia published a report stating "The evidence is clear ... that direct systematic instruction in phonics during the early years of schooling is an essential foundation for teaching children to read". Phonics has been gaining acceptance in many other countries as can be seen from this page Practices by country or region.

Other important elements are: rapid automatized naming (RAN), a general understanding of the orthography of the language, and practice.
 Rapid automatized naming, the ability to say quickly the names of letters, objects and colors, predicts an individual's ability to read. This might be linked to the importance of quick retrieval of phonological representations from long-term memory in reading and the importance of object-naming circuits in the left cerebral hemisphere that are recruited to underpin a learner's word-recognition abilities.
 Orthography describes or defines the set of symbols used in a language, and the rules about how to write these symbols (i.e., the conventional spelling system of a language). Orthographic Development proceeds in increasing complexity as a person learns to read. Some of the first things to be learnt are the orthographic conventions such as the direction of reading and that there are differing typefaces and capitalization for each symbol. In general, this means that to read proficiently, the reader has to understand elements of a written language. In the United States, a limited amount of spelling is taught up to grade four, and beyond that "we gain orthographic expertise by reading"; so the amount and variety of texts that children read is important.
 Practice: Repeated exposure to print improves many aspects of learning to read and most importantly the knowledge of individual words. It increases the speed at which high frequency words are recognized which allows for increased fluency in reading. It also supports orthographic development, reading comprehension and vocabulary development. Research suggests there is value in reading words both in isolation and in context. Reading words in isolation promotes faster reading times and better memory for spellings; whereas, reading words in context improves semantic knowledge and comprehension.

Reading difficulties
Difficulties in reading typically involve difficulty with one or more of the following: decoding, reading rate, reading fluency, or reading comprehension.

Decoding

Brain activity in young and older children can be used to predict future reading skill. Cross model mapping between the orthographic and phonologic areas in the brain are critical in reading. Thus, the amount of activation in the left dorsal inferior frontal gyrus while performing reading tasks can be used to predict later reading ability and advancement. Young children with higher phonological word characteristic processing have significantly better reading skills later on than older children who focus on whole-word orthographic representation.

Difficulty with decoding is marked by having not acquired the phoneme-grapheme mapping concept. One specific disability characterized by poor decoding is dyslexia, defined as brain-based type of learning disability that specifically impairs a person's ability to read. These individuals typically read at levels significantly lower than expected despite having normal intelligence. It can also be inherited in some families, and recent studies have identified a number of genes that may predispose an individual to developing dyslexia. Although the symptoms vary from person to person, common characteristics among people with dyslexia are difficulty with spelling, phonological processing (the manipulation of sounds), and/or rapid visual-verbal responding. Adults can have either developmental dyslexia or acquired dyslexia which occurs after a brain injury, stroke or dementia.

Reading rate

Individuals with reading rate difficulties tend to have accurate word recognition and normal comprehension abilities, but their reading speed is below grade level. Strategies such as guided reading (guided, repeated oral-reading instruction), may help improve a reader's reading rate.

Many studies show that increasing reading speed improves comprehension. Reading speed requires a long time to reach adult levels. According to Carver (1990), children's reading speed increases throughout the school years. On average, from grade 2 to college, reading rate increases 14 standard-length words per minute each year (where one standard-length word is defined as six characters in text, including punctuation and spaces).

Scientific studies have demonstrated that speed reading – defined here as capturing and decoding words faster than 900 wpm – is not feasible given the limits set by the anatomy of the eye.

Reading fluency
Individuals with reading fluency difficulties fail to maintain a fluid, smooth pace when reading. Strategies used for overcoming reading rate difficulties are also useful in addressing reading fluency issues.

Reading comprehension

Individuals with reading comprehension difficulties are commonly described as poor comprehenders. They have normal decoding skills as well as a fluid rate of reading, but have difficulty comprehending text when reading. The simple view of reading holds that reading comprehension requires both decoding skills and oral language comprehension ability.

Increasing vocabulary knowledge, listening skills and teaching basic comprehension techniques may help facilitate better reading comprehension. It is suggested that students receive brief, explicit instruction in reading comprehension strategies in the areas of vocabulary, noticing understanding, and connecting ideas.

Scarborough's Reading Rope also outlines some of the essential ingredients of reading comprehension.

Radio Reading Service
In some countries, a radio reading service provides a service for blind people and others who chose to hear newspapers, books, and other printed material read aloud, typically by volunteers. An example is Australia's Radio Print Handicapped Network with stations in capital cities and some other areas.

Reading achievement: national and international reports
The following organizations measure and report on reading achievement in the United States and internationally:

NAEP

In the United States, the National Assessment of Educational Progress or NAEP ("The Nation's Report Card") is the national assessment of what students know and can do in various subjects. Four of these subjects – reading, writing, mathematics and science – are assessed most frequently and reported at the state and district level, usually for grades 4 and 8.

In 2019, with respect to the reading skills of the nation's grade-four public school students, 35% performed at or above the NAEP Proficient level (solid academic performance) and 65% performed at or above the NAEP Basic level (partial mastery of the proficient level skills). It is believed that students who read below the basic level do not have sufficient support to complete their schoolwork.

Reading scores for the individual States and Districts are available on the NAEP site. Between 2017 and 2019 Mississippi was the only State that had a grade-four reading score increase and 17 States had a score decrease.

The COVID-19 pandemic had a significant impact on reading results in the United States. In 2022 the average basic-level reading score among elementary schoolchildren was 3 points lower compared to 2019 (the previous assessment year) and roughly equivalent to the first reading assessment in 1992. Students of all ethnic groups other than Asians saw their scores decline. However, "black, Hispanic, and American Indian/Alaska Native (AIAN) students and students in high-poverty schools were disproportionately impacted". (This was substantiated by other sources). In 2022, no states had a reading score increase and 30 states had a score decrease. The results by race or ethnicity were as follows:

NAEP reading assessment results are reported as average scores on a 0–500 scale. The Basic Level is 208 and the Proficient Level is 238. The average reading score for grade-four public school students was 219. Female students had an average score that was 7 points higher than male students. Students who were eligible for the National School Lunch Program (NSLP) had an average score that was 28 points lower than that for students who were not eligible.

PIAAC

The Programme for the International Assessment of Adult Competencies (PIAAC) is an international study by the Organisation for Economic Co-operation and Development (OECD) of cognitive and workplace skills in 39 countries between 2011 and 2018. The Survey measures adults' proficiency in key information-processing skills – literacy, numeracy and problem solving. The focus is on the working-age population between the ages of 16 and 65. For example, the study shows the ranking of 38 countries as to the literacy proficiency among adults. According to the 2019 OECD report, the five countries with the highest ranking are Japan, Finland, the Netherlands, Sweden and Australia; whereas Canada is 12th, England (UK) is 16th, and the United States is 19th. It is also worth noting that the PIAAC table A2.1 (2013) shows the percentage of adults reading at-or-below level one (out of five levels). Some examples are Japan 4.9%, Finland 10.6%, Netherlands 11.7%, Australia 12.6%, Sweden 13.3%, Canada 16.4%, England 16.4%, and the United States 16.9%.

PIRLS

The Progress in International Reading Literacy Study (PIRLS) is an international study of reading (comprehension) achievement in fourth graders. It is designed to measure children's reading literacy achievement, to provide a baseline for future studies of trends in achievement, and to gather information about children's home and school experiences in learning to read. The 2016 PIRLS report shows the 4th grade reading achievement by country in two categories (literary and informational). The ten countries with the highest overall reading average are the Russian Federation, Singapore, Hong Kong SAR, Ireland, Finland, Poland, Northern Ireland, Norway, Chinese Taipei and England (UK). Some others are: the United States 15th, Australia 21st, Canada 23rd, and New Zealand 33rd.

PISA

The Programme for International Student Assessment (PISA) measures 15-year-old school pupils scholastic performance on mathematics, science, and reading. In 2018, of the 79 participating countries/economies, on average, students in Beijing, Shanghai, Jiangsu and Zhejiang (China) and Singapore outperformed students from all other countries in reading, mathematics and science. 21 countries have reading scores above the OECD average scores and many of the scores are not statistically different.

Critics, however, say PISA is fundamentally flawed in its underlying view of education, its implementation, and its interpretation and impact on education globally. In 2014, more than 100 academics from around the world called for a moratorium on PISA. According to a 2023 book, PISA is failing in its mission. It suggests that flatlined student outcomes and policy shortcomings have much to do with PISA’s implicit ideological biases, structural impediments such as union advocacy, and conflicts of interest.

EQAO

The Education Quality and Accountability Office, EQAO, is an agency of the government of Ontario, Canada that reports on the publicly funded school system. In 2022, it reported that 77% of grade three students in Ontario met the provincial standard in reading in 2018-2019. This decreased to 73% in 2021-2022.

53% of Grade three students with special needs met the standard in 2018-2019, and this reduced to 48% in 2021-2022. 72% of grade three students who are English language learners met the standard in 2018-2019, and this reduced to 67% in 2021-2022.

History of reading

The history of reading dates back to the invention of writing during the 4th millennium BC. Although reading print text is now an important way for the general population to access information, this has not always been the case. With some exceptions, only a small percentage of the population in many countries was considered literate before the Industrial Revolution. Some of the pre-modern societies with generally high literacy rates included classical Athens and the Islamic Caliphate.

Scholars assume that reading aloud (Latin clare legere) was the more common practice in antiquity, and that reading silently (legere tacite or legere sibi) was unusual. In his Confessions, Saint Augustine remarks on Saint Ambrose's unusual habit of reading silently in the 4th century AD.

During the Age of Enlightenment, elite individuals promoted passive reading, rather than creative interpretation. Some thinkers of that era believed that construction, or the creation of writing and producing a product, was a sign of initiative and active participation in society – and viewed consumption (reading) as simply taking in what constructors made. Also during this era, writing was considered superior to reading in society. They considered readers of that time passive citizens, because they did not produce a product. Michel de Certeau argued that the elites of the Age of Enlightenment were responsible for this general belief. Michel de Certeau believed that reading required venturing into an author's land, but taking away what the reader wanted specifically. This view held that writing was a superior art to reading within the hierarchical constraints of the era.

Before the mid 18th century, children's books in England usually had religious or instructional (school books, conduct books) themes, but by the mid to late 18th century books were designed to delight and novels would come into popularity. By the end of the 18th century literature made for children were flourishing, with perhaps as many as 50 books being printed every year in major cities.

In 18th-century Europe, the then new practice of reading alone in bed was, for a time, considered dangerous and immoral. As reading became less a communal, oral practice, and more a private, silent one – and as sleeping increasingly moved from communal sleeping areas to individual bedrooms, some raised concern that reading in bed presented various dangers, such as fires caused by bedside candles. Some modern critics, however, speculate that these concerns were based on the fear that readers – especially women – could escape familial and communal obligations and transgress moral boundaries through the private fantasy worlds in books. Also during the 18th century in England, reading novels was often criticized as a time-wasting pastime, when contrasted with the cultural seriousness carried by reading history, classical literature or poetry.

Chapbooks were small, cheap forms of literature for children and adults that were sold on the streets, and covered a range of subjects such as ghost stories, crime, fantasy, politics and disaster updates. They provided simple reading matter and were commonplace across England from the 17th to the 19th century. They are known to have been passed down the generations. Their readership would have been largely among the poor, and among children of the middle class.

Reading became even more pronounced in the 19th century with public notes, broadsides, catchpennies and printed songs becoming common street literature, it informed and entertained the public before newspapers became readily available. Advertisements and local news, such as offers of rewards for catching criminals or for the return of stolen goods, appeared on public notices and handbills, while cheaply printed sheets – broadsheets and ballads – covered political or criminal news such murders, trials, executions, disasters and rescues.

Technological improvements during the industrial revolution in printing and paper production; and new distribution networks enabled by improved roads and rail helped push an increased demand for printed (reading) matter. Besides this, social and educational changes (such as wider schooling rates) along with increasing literacy rates, particularly among the middle and working classes, helped boost a new mass market for printed material. The arrival of gas and electric lighting in private homes meant that reading after dark no longer had to take place by oil lamp or candlelight.

In 19th century Russia, reading practices were highly varied, as people from a wide range of social statuses read Russian and foreign-language texts ranging from high literature to the peasant lubok. Provincial readers such as Andrei Chikhachev give evidence of the omnivorous appetite for fiction and non-fiction alike among middling landowners.

History of learning to read

The history of learning to read dates back to the invention of writing during the 4th millennium BC.

With respect to the English language in the United States, the phonics principle of teaching reading was first presented by John Hart in 1570, who suggested the teaching of reading should focus on the relationship between what is now referred to as graphemes (letters) and phonemes (sounds).

In the colonial times of the United States, reading material was not written specifically for children, so instruction material consisted primarily of the Bible and some patriotic essays. The most influential early textbook was The New England Primer, published in 1687. There was little consideration given to the best ways to teach reading or assess reading comprehension.

Phonics was a popular way to learn reading in the 1800s. William Holmes McGuffey (1800–1873), an American educator, author, and Presbyterian minister who had a lifelong interest in teaching children, compiled the first four of the McGuffey Readers in 1836.

The whole-word method was introduced into the English-speaking world by Thomas Hopkins Gallaudet, the director of the American School for the Deaf. It was designed to educate deaf people by placing a word alongside a picture. In 1830, Gallaudet described his method of teaching children to recognize a total of 50 sight words written on cards. Horace Mann, the Secretary of the Board of Education of Massachusetts, U.S., favored the method for everyone, and by 1837 the method was adopted by the Boston Primary School Committee.

By 1844 the defects of the whole-word method became so apparent to Boston schoolmasters that they urged the Board to return to phonics. In 1929, Samuel Orton, a neuropathologist in Iowa, concluded that the cause of children's reading problems was the new sight method of reading. His findings were published in the February 1929 issue of the Journal of Educational Psychology in the article "The Sight Reading Method of Teaching Reading as a Source of Reading Disability".

The meaning-based curriculum came to dominate reading instruction by the second quarter of the 20th century. In the 1930s and 1940s, reading programs became very focused on comprehension and taught children to read whole words by sight. Phonics was taught as a last resort.

Edward William Dolch developed his list of sight words in 1936 by studying the most frequently occurring words in children's books of that era. Children are encouraged to memorize the words with the idea that it will help them read more fluently. Many teachers continue to use this list, although some researchers consider the theory of sight word reading to be a "myth". Researchers and literacy organizations suggest it would be more effective if students learned the words using a phonics approach.

In 1955, Rudolf Flesch published a book entitled Why Johnny Can't Read, a passionate argument in favor of teaching children to read using phonics, adding to the reading debate among educators, researchers, and parents.

Government-funded research on reading instruction in the United States and elsewhere began in the 1960s. In the 1970s and 1980s, researchers began publishing studies with evidence on the effectiveness of different instructional approaches. During this time, researchers at the National Institutes of Health (NIH) conducted studies that showed early reading acquisition depends on the understanding of the connection between sounds and letters (i.e. phonics). However, this appears to have had little effect on educational practices in public schools.

In the 1970s, the whole language method was introduced. This method de-emphasizes the teaching of phonics out of context (e.g. reading books), and is intended to help readers "guess" the right word. It teaches that guessing individual words should involve three systems (letter clues, meaning clues from context, and the syntactical structure of the sentence). It became the primary method of reading instruction in the 1980s and 1990s. However, it is falling out of favor. The neuroscientist Mark Seidenberg refers to it as a "theoretical zombie" because it persists in spite of a lack of supporting evidence. It is still widely practiced in related methods such as sight words, the three-cueing system and balanced literacy.

In the 1980s the three-cueing system (the searchlights model in England) emerged. According to a 2010 survey 75% of teachers in the United States teach the three-cueing system. It teaches children to guess a word by using "meaning cues" (semantic, syntactic and graphophonic). While the system does help students to "make better guesses", it does not help when the words become more sophisticated; and it reduces the amount of practice time available to learn essential decoding skills. Consequently, present-day researchers such as cognitive neuroscientists Mark Seidenberg and professor Timothy Shanahan do not support the theory. In England, synthetic phonics is intended to replace "the searchlights multi-cueing model".

In the 1990s Balanced literacy arose. It is a theory of teaching reading and writing that is not clearly defined. It may include elements such as word study and phonics mini-lessons, differentiated learning, cueing, leveled reading, shared reading, guided reading, independent reading and sight words. For some, balanced literacy strikes a balance between whole language and phonics. Others say balanced literacy in practice usually means the whole language approach to reading. According to a survey in 2010, 68% of K–2 teachers in the United States practice balanced literacy. Furthermore, only 52% of teachers included phonics in their definition of balanced literacy.

In 1996 the California Department of Education took an increased interest in using phonics in schools. And in 1997 the department called for grade one teaching in concepts about print, phonemic awareness, decoding and word recognition, and vocabulary and concept development.

By 1998 in the U.K. whole language instruction and the searchlights-model were still the norm, however there was some attention to teaching phonics in the early grades, as seen in the National Literacy Strategies.

21st century

Beginning in 2000, several reading research reports were published:
 2000 – The National Reading Panel (U.S.) that identified five ingredients of effective reading instruction: phonemic awareness, phonics, fluency, vocabulary and comprehension.
 2005 – The Australian report on Teaching reading that supports the use of systematic phonics.
 2006 – The United Kingdom Independent review of the teaching of early reading (Rose Report 2006) that supports systematic synthetic phonics.

In Australia the 2005 report, Teaching Reading, recommends teaching reading based on evidence and teaching systematic, explicit phonics within an integrated approach. The executive summary says "systematic phonics instruction is critical if children are to be taught to read well, whether or not they experience reading difficulties". , The State Government of Victoria, Australia, publishes a website containing a comprehensive Literacy Teaching Toolkit including effective reading instruction, phonics, and sample phonics lessons.

In Scotland a seven-year study (the Clackmannanshire Report) was published in 2005. It compared analytic phonics with synthetic phonics and advantaged students with disadvantaged students. The report found that, using synthetic phonics children from lower socio-economic backgrounds performed at the same level as children from advantaged backgrounds in primary school (whereas with analytic phonics teaching, they did significantly less well.); and boys performed better than or as well as girls. A five-year follow-up of the study concluded that the beneficial effects were long-lasting, in fact the reading gains increased. Subsequently, Education Scotland concluded that explicit, systematic phonics programs, usually embedded in a rich literacy environment, give an additional four months progress over other programs such as whole language, and are particularly beneficial for young learners (aged 4–7). There is evidence, though less secure, that synthetic phonics programs may be more beneficial than analytic phonics programs; however it is most important to teach systematically.

Until 2006, the English language syllabus of Singapore advocated "a balance between decoding and meaning-based instruction … phonics and whole language". However, a review in 2006 advocated for a "systematic" approach. Subsequently, the syllabus in 2010 had no mention of whole language and advocated for a balance between "systematic and explicit instruction" and "a rich language environment". It called for increased instruction in oral language skills together with phonemic awareness and the key decoding elements of synthetic phonics, analytic phonics and analogy phonics.

In 2007 the Department of Education (DE) in Northern Ireland was required by law to teach children foundational skills in phonological awareness and the understanding that "words are made up of sounds and syllables and that sounds are represented by letters (phoneme/grapheme awareness)". In 2010 the DE required that teachers receive support in using evidence-based practices to teach literacy and numeracy, including: a "systematic programme of high-quality phonics" that is explicit, structured, well-paced, interactive, engaging, and applied in a meaningful context.

In 2008, the National Center for Family Literacy, with the National Institute for Literacy, published a report entitled Developing Early Literacy. It is a synthesis of the scientific research on the development of early literacy skills in children ages zero to five as determined by the National Early Literacy Panel that was convened in 2002. Amongst other things, the report concluded that code-focused interventions on the early literacy and conventional literacy skills of young children yield a moderate to large effect on the predictors of later reading and writing, irrespective of socioeconomic status, ethnicity, or population density.

In 2010 the Common Core State Standards Initiative was introduced in the United States. The English Language Arts Standards for Reading: Foundational Skills in Grades 1–5 include recommendations to teach print concepts, phonological awareness, phonics and word recognition, and fluency.

In the United Kingdom a 2010 government white paper contained plans to train all primary school teachers in phonics. The 2013 curriculum has "statutory requirements" that, amongst other things, students in years one and two be capable in using systematic synthetic phonics in regards to word reading, reading comprehension, fluency, and writing. This includes having skills in "sound to graphemes", "decoding", and "blending".

In 2013, the National Commission for UNESCO launched the Leading for Literacy project to develop the literacy skills of grades 1 and 2 students. The project facilitates the training of primary school teachers in the use of a synthetic phonics program. From 2013 to 2015, the Trinidad and Tobago Ministry of Education appointed seven reading specialist to help primary and secondary school teachers improve their literacy instruction. From February 2014 to January 2016, literacy coaches were hired in selected primary schools to assist teachers of kindergarten, grades 1 and 2 with pedagogy and content of early literacy instruction. Primary schools have been provided with literacy resources for instruction, including phonemic awareness, word recognition, vocabulary manipulatives, phonics and comprehension.

In 2013 the State of Mississippi passed the Literacy-Based Promotion Act. The Mississippi Department of Education provided resources for teachers in the areas of phonemic awareness, phonics, vocabulary, fluency, comprehension and reading strategies.

The school curriculum in Ireland focuses on ensuring children are literate in both the English language and the Irish language. The 2014 teachers' Professional Development guide covers the seven areas of attitude and motivation, fluency, comprehension, word identification, vocabulary, phonological awareness, phonics, and assessment. It recommends that phonics be taught in a systematic and structured way and is preceded by training in phonological awareness.

In 2014 the California Department of Education said children should know how to decode regularly spelled one-syllable words by mid-first grade, and be phonemically aware (especially able to segment and blend phonemes)". In grades two and three children receive explicit instruction in advanced phonic-analysis and reading multi-syllabic and more complex words.

In 2015 the New York State Public School system revised its English Language Arts learning standards, calling for teaching involving "reading or literacy experiences" as well as phonemic awareness from prekindergarten to grade 1 and phonics and word recognition for grades 1–4. That same year, the Ohio Legislature set minimum standards requiring the use of phonics including guidelines for teaching phonemic awareness, phonics, fluency, vocabulary and comprehension.

In 2016 the What Works Clearinghouse and the Institute of Education Sciences published an Educator's Practice Guide on Foundational Skills to Support Reading for Understanding in Kindergarten Through 3rd Grade. It contains four recommendations to support reading: 1) teach students academic language skills, including the use of inferential and narrative language, and vocabulary knowledge, 2) develop awareness of the segments of sounds in speech and how they link to letters (phonemic awareness and phonics), 3) teach students to decode words, analyze word parts, and write and recognize words (phonics and synthetic phonics), and 4) ensure that each student reads connected text every day to support reading accuracy, fluency, and comprehension.

In 2016 the Colorado Department of Education updated their Elementary Teacher Literacy Standards with standards for development in the areas of phonology, phonics and word recognition, fluent automatic reading, vocabulary, text comprehension, handwriting, spelling, and written expression. At the same time, the Department of Education in Delaware produced a plan to improve education results. It states that "students who aren't reading at grade level aren't able to comprehend up to half of the printed fourth-grade curriculum". Furthermore, it says a gap exists between what is known about how to teach reading and how teachers are able to teach reading. It goes on to say that teachers' preparation programs must include evidence-based practices, including the five essential components of reading instruction (phonemic awareness, phonics, fluency, vocabulary, and comprehension).

The European Literacy Policy Network (ELINET) 2016 reports that Hungarian children in grades one and two receive explicit instruction in phonemic awareness and phonics "as the route to decode words". In grades three and four they continue to apply their knowledge of phonics, however the emphasis shifts to the more meaning-focused technical aspects of reading and writing (i.e., vocabulary, types of texts, reading strategies, spelling, punctuation and grammar).

In 2017 the Ohio Department of Education adopted Reading Standards for Foundational Skills K–12 laying out a systematic approach to teaching phonological awareness in kindergarten and grade one, and grade-level phonics and word analysis skills in decoding words (including fluency and comprehension) in grades 1–5.

In 2018 the Arkansas Department of Education published a report about their new initiative known as R.I.S.E., Reading Initiative for Student Excellence, that was the result of The Right to Read Act, passed in 2017. The first goal of this initiative is to provide educators with the in-depth knowledge and skills of "the science of reading" and evidence-based instructional strategies. This included a focus on research-based instruction on phonological awareness, phonics, vocabulary, fluency, and comprehension; specifically systematic and explicit instruction.

, the Ministry of Education in New Zealand has online information to help teachers to support their students in years 1–3 in relation to sounds, letters, and words. It states that phonics instruction "is not an end in itself" and it is not necessary to teach students "every combination of letters and sounds".

In 2018, ScienceDirect published the results of a study of early literacy and numeracy outcomes in developing countries entitled Identifying the essential ingredients to literacy and numeracy improvement: Teacher professional development and coaching, student textbooks, and structured teachers' guides. It concluded that "Including teachers' guides was by far the most cost-effective intervention".

There has been a strong debate in France on the teaching of phonics ("méthode syllabique") versus whole language ("méthode globale"). After the 1990s, supporters of the later started defending a so-called "mixed method" (also known as Balanced literacy) in which approaches from both methods are used. Influential researchers in psycho-pedagogy, cognitive sciences and neurosciences, such as Stanislas Dehaene and Michel Fayol have put their heavy scientific weight on the side of phonics. In 2018 the ministry created a science educational council that openly supported phonics. In April 2018, the minister issued a set of four guiding documents for early teaching of reading and mathematics and a booklet detailing phonics recommendations. Some have described his stance as "traditionalist", but he openly declared that the so-called mixed approach is no serious choice.

In 2019 the Minnesota Department of Education introduced standards requiring school districts to "develop a local literacy plan to ensure that all students have achieved early reading proficiency by no later than the end of third grade" in accordance with a Statute of the Minnesota Legislature requiring elementary teachers to be able to implement comprehensive, scientifically based reading and oral language instruction in the five reading areas of phonemic awareness, phonics, fluency, vocabulary, and comprehension.

Also in 2019, 26% of grade 4 students in Louisiana were reading at the proficiency level according to the Nation's Report Card, as compared to the National Average of 34%. In March 2019 the Louisiana Department of Education revised their curriculum for K–12 English Language Arts including requirements for instruction in the alphabetic principle, phonological awareness, phonics and word recognition, fluency and comprehension.

And again in 2019, 30% of grade 4 students in Texas were reading at the proficiency level according to the Nation's Report Card. In June of that year the Texas Legislature passed a Bill requiring all kindergarten through grade-three teachers and principals to "begin a teacher literacy achievement academy before the 2022–2023 school year". The required content of the academies' training includes the areas of The Science of Teaching Reading, Oral Language, Phonological Awareness, Decoding (i.e. Phonics), Fluency and Comprehension. The goal is to "increase teacher knowledge and implementation of evidence-based practices to positively impact student literacy achievement".

In 2021, the State of Connecticut passed an act concerning the "right to read" that will take effect in 2023. It requires education standards that are evidenced-based and scientifically based and focused on competency in the five areas of reading: phonemic awareness, phonics, fluency, vocabulary development, and reading fluency, including oral skills and reading comprehension. In the same year, the state of North Carolina passed a bill requiring that the teaching of reading be based on the science of reading.

In Canada, on January 27, 2022, the Ontario Human Rights Commission (OHRC) released a report on its public inquiry into the right to read. It followed the unanimous decision of the Supreme Court of Canada, on November 9, 2012, recognizing that learning to read is not a privilege, but a basic and essential human right.

The OHRC's report deals with all students, not just those with learning disabilities. The inquiry found that Ontario is not fulfilling its obligations to meet students' right to read. Specifically, foundational word-reading skills are not effectively targeted in Ontario's education system. With science-based approaches to reading instruction, early screening and intervention, we should see only about 5% of students reading below grade level. However, in 2018–2019, 26% of all Ontario Grade 3 students and 53% of Grade 3 students with special education needs (students who have an Individual Education Plan), were not meeting the provincial EQAO standard. The results improved only slightly for Grade 6 students, where 19% of all students and 47% of students with special education needs did not meet the provincial standard.

The Ontario curriculum encourages the use of the three-cueing system and balanced literacy, which are ineffective because they teach children to "guess" the meaning of a word rather than sound it out. What is required is a) evidence-based curriculum and instruction (including explicit and systematic instruction in phonemic awareness and phonics), b) evidence-based screening assessments, c) evidence-based reading interventions, d) accommodations that are not used as a substitute for teaching students to read, and e) professional assessments (yet, not required for interventions or accommodations).

The Minister of Education for Ontario responded to this report by saying the government is taking immediate action to improve student literacy and making longer-term reforms to modernize the way reading is taught and assessed in schools, with a focus on phonics. Their plan includes "revising the elementary Language curriculum and the Grade 9 English course with scientific, evidence-based approaches that emphasize direct, explicit and systematic instruction, and removing references to unscientific discovery and inquiry-based learning, including the three-cueing system, by 2023."

On April 23, 2022, the Center for Research in Education and Social Policy at the University of Delaware presented the results of a study of the long-term effects of Reading Recovery. The conclusion was that the "long-term impact estimates were significant and negative". The study found that children who received Reading Recovery had scores on state reading tests in third and fourth grade that were below the test scores of similar children who did not receive Reading Recovery. It suggests three possible hypotheses for this outcome: 1) while Reading Recovery produces large impacts on early literacy measures, it does not give students the required skills for success in later grades; or, 2) the gains are lost because students do not receive sufficient intervention in later grades; or, 3) the impacts of the early intervention was washed out by subsequent experiences.

Between 2013 and 2022, 30 States have passed laws or implemented new policies related to evidence-based reading instruction.

For more information on reading educational developments, see Phonics practices by country or region.

Other terms
 Subvocalization is the sense that a reader is combining silent reading with internal sounding of the words. Advocates of speed reading claim it can be a bad habit that slows reading and comprehension, but some researchers say this is a fallacy since there is no actual speaking involved. Instead, it may help skilled readers to read since they are utilizing the phonological code to understand words (e.g., the difference between PERmit and perMIT).
 Speed reading is the claim that you can increase reading speed without experiencing an unacceptable reduction in comprehension or retention. Methods include skimming or the chunking of words in a body of text to increase the rate of reading. However, cognitive neuroscientists such as Stanislas Dehaene and Mark Seidenberg say that claims of reading up to 1,000 words per minute 'must be viewed with skepticism' and that 'people are as likely to read thousands of words per minute as they are to run faster than the speed of light'". It is estimated that the average reading speed for adults in English is from 175 to 320 words per minute.
 Proofreading is a kind of reading for the purpose of detecting typographical errors. It is not reading in the usual sense, as they may largely suspend comprehension while doing so.
 Rereading is reading a book more than once. "One cannot read a book: one can only reread it," Vladimir Nabokov once said.
 Structure-proposition-evaluation (SPE) method, popularized by Mortimer Adler in How to Read a Book, mainly for non-fiction treatise, in which one reads a writing in three passes: 1) for the structure of the work, 2) for the logical propositions made, and 3) for evaluation of the merits of the arguments and conclusions. This method involves suspending judgment of the work or its arguments until they are fully understood.
 Survey-question-read-recite-review (SQ3R) method, often taught in public schools, which involves reading so as to be able to teach what is read, and is appropriate for instructors preparing to teach material without referring to notes.
 Rapid serial visual presentation (RSVP) reading involves presenting the words in a sentence one word at a time at the same location on the display screen, at a specified eccentricity; for studying the timing of vision.
 In-Depth Reading is a method that is used to gain deeper meaning and comprehension of a text, research detailed information for this assignment, and read very difficult sections of a text. Five strategies include the RAP strategy, the RIDA strategy, the Five S method, and SQ3R. This is also known as Exploratory reading, which allows multiple people narrower purpose, in order to understand the concepts or arguments of a text.

Gallery

Paintings

Photographs

See also

 Educational software
 Primary education
 Reading disability
 Reading for special needs
 Women reading in art

References

Further reading

 
 
 
 
 
 
 
 
 
 
 
 
 
 
 
 
 National Endowment for the Arts (June 2004). "Reading at Risk: A Survey of Literary Reading in America" (pdf)
 
 Purdy, Jessica G., and Rosamund Oates. Communities of Print: Books and Their Readers in Early Modern Europe. Edited by Jessica G. Purdy and Rosamund Oates. Leiden, Netherlands ;: Brill, 2021.

External links

 The International Literacy Association (ILA) official website
 The reading league
 Science of reading – the podcast
 Journal of Educational Psychology
 Review of Educational Research
 Society for the Scientific Study of Reading

 
Writing systems
Orthography
Applied linguistics
Psycholinguistics
Educational psychology